Ophiactidae are a family of brittle stars.

Genera
The following genera are recognised by the World Register of Marine Species :
Hemipholis Lyman, 1865
Histampica A.M. Clark, 1970
Ophiactis Lütken, 1856
Ophiopholis Müller & Troschel, 1842
Ophiopus Ljungman, 1867

References

 
Ophiurida
Echinoderm families